Navia is a genus of plants in the family Bromeliaceae, containing 95 species. Described as early as 1830 in Guyana, they are commonly cultivated for their colorful foliage and inflorescences. All the species are native to northern South America (Guyana, Suriname, Venezuela, Colombia, northern Brazil).

Species

 Navia abysmophila L.B. Smith -  Amazonas State in Venezuela
 Navia acaulis Martius ex Schult. & Schult.f. - Colombia
 Navia affinis L.B. Smith - Amazonas State in Venezuela
 Navia aliciae L.B. Smith, Steyermark & Robinson - Amazonas State in Venezuela
 Navia aloifolia L.B. Smith - Amazonas State in Venezuela
 Navia angustifolia (Baker) Mez - Guyana
 Navia arida L.B. Smith & Steyermark - Venezuela, Guyana
 Navia aurea L.B. Smith - Amazonas State in Venezuela
 Navia axillaris Betancur - Colombia
 Navia barbellata L.B. Smith - Guyana
 Navia berryana L.B. Smith, Steyermark & Robinson -  Amazonas State in Venezuela
 Navia bicolor L.B. Smith - Colombia
 Navia brachyphylla L.B. Smith -  Amazonas State in Venezuela
 Navia breweri L.B. Smith & Steyermark - Bolívar State in Venezuela
 Navia cardonae L.B. Smith - Bolívar State in Venezuela
 Navia caricifolia L.B. Smith -  Amazonas State in Venezuela
 Navia carnevalii L.B. Smith & Steyermark -  Amazonas State in Venezuela
 Navia caulescens Martius ex Schult. & Schult.f. - Colombia
 Navia caurensis L.B. Smith - Bolívar State in Venezuela
 Navia colorata L.B. Smith -  Amazonas State in Venezuela
 Navia connata L.B. Smith & Steyermark - Bolívar State in Venezuela
 Navia crassicaulis L.B. Smith, Steyermark & Robinson -  Amazonas State in Venezuela
 Navia cretacea L.B. Smith -  Amazonas State in Venezuela
 Navia crispa L.B. Smith - Venezuela
 Navia cucullata L.B. Smith - Bolívar State in Venezuela
 Navia culcitaria L.B. Smith, Steyermark & Robinson -  Amazonas State in Venezuela
 Navia duidae L.B. Smith -  Amazonas State in Venezuela
 Navia ebracteata Betancur & Arbeláez - Colombia
 Navia emergens L.B. Smith, Steyermark & Robinson - Bolívar State in Venezuela
 Navia filifera L.B. Smith, Steyermark & Robinson -  Amazonas State in Venezuela
 Navia fontoides L.B. Smith - Colombia
 Navia garcia-barrigae L.B. Smith - Colombia
 Navia geaster L.B. Smith, Steyermark & Robinson - Bolívar State in Venezuela
 Navia glandulifera B. Holst - Bolívar State in Venezuela
 Navia glauca L.B. Smith -  Amazonas State in Venezuela
 Navia gleasonii L.B. Smith -  Guyana, Amazonas State in Venezuela
 Navia graminifolia L.B. Smith - Colombia
 Navia heliophila L.B. Smith - Colombia
 Navia huberiana L.B. Smith, Steyermark & Robinson -  Amazonas State in Venezuela
 Navia immersa L.B. Smith -  Amazonas State in Venezuela
 Navia incrassata L.B. Smith & Steyermark - Bolívar State in Venezuela
 Navia intermedia L.B. Smith & Steyermark - Bolívar State in Venezuela
 Navia involucrata L.B. Smith -  Amazonas State in Venezuela
 Navia jauana L.B. Smith, Steyermark & Robinson - Bolívar State in Venezuela
 Navia lactea L.B. Smith, Steyermark & Robinson -  Amazonas State in Venezuela
 Navia lanigera L.B. Smith -  Amazonas State in Venezuela
 Navia lasiantha L.B. Smith & Steyermark - Bolívar State in Venezuela
 Navia latifolia L.B. Smith -  Amazonas State in Venezuela
 Navia lepidota L.B. Smith  -  Amazonas State in Venezuela
 Navia liesneri L.B. Smith, Steyermark & Robinson -  Amazonas State in Venezuela
 Navia lindmanioides L.B. Smith -  Amazonas State in Venezuela
 Navia linearis L.B. Smith, Steyermark & Robinson -  Amazonas State in Venezuela
 Navia luzuloides L.B. Smith, Steyermark & Robinson - Bolívar State in Venezuela
 Navia maguirei L.B. Smith - Suriname 
 Navia mima L.B. Smith -  Amazonas State in Venezuela
 Navia mosaica B. Holst -  Amazonas State in Venezuela
 Navia myriantha L.B. Smith -  Amazonas State in Brazil
 Navia navicularis L.B. Smith & Steyermark - Bolívar State in Venezuela
 Navia nubicola L.B. Smith -  Amazonas State in Venezuela
 Navia ocellata L.B. Smith -  Amazonas State in Venezuela
 Navia octopoides L.B. Smith -  Amazonas State in Venezuela
 Navia ovoidea L.B. Smith, Steyermark & Robinson - Bolívar State in Venezuela
 Navia paruana B. Holst -  Amazonas State in Venezuela
 Navia parvula L.B. Smith -  Amazonas State in Venezuela
 Navia patria L.B. Smith & Steyermark -  Amazonas State in Venezuela
 Navia pauciflora L.B. Smith -  Amazonas State in Venezuela
 Navia phelpsiae L.B. Smith -  Amazonas State in Venezuela
 Navia pilarica Betancur - Colombia
 Navia piresii L.B. Smith, Steyermark & Robinson -  Amazonas State in Brazil
 Navia polyglomerata L.B. Smith, Steyermark & Robinson -  Amazonas State in Venezuela
 Navia pulvinata L.B. Smith -  Amazonas State in Venezuela
 Navia pungens L.B. Smith -  Amazonas State in Venezuela
 Navia robinsonii L.B. Smith - Bolívar State in Venezuela
 Navia sandwithii L.B. Smith - Guyana 
 Navia saxicola L.B. Smith -  Amazonas State in Venezuela
 Navia schultesiana L.B. Smith - Colombia
 Navia scirpiflora L.B. Smith, Steyermark & Robinson - Bolívar State in Venezuela
 Navia scopulorum L.B. Smith - Venezuela
 Navia semiserrata L.B. Smith -  Amazonas State in Venezuela
 Navia serrulata L.B. Smith -  Amazonas State in Venezuela
 Navia splendens L.B. Smith -  Amazonas State in Venezuela, Guyana
 Navia stenodonta L.B. Smith -  Amazonas State in Venezuela
 Navia steyermarkii L.B. Smith -  Amazonas State in Venezuela
 Navia subpetiolata L.B. Smith -  Amazonas State in Venezuela
 Navia tentaculata B. Holst - Bolívar State in Venezuela
 Navia terramarae L.B. Smith & Steyermark -  Amazonas State in Venezuela
 Navia trichodonta L.B. Smith -  Amazonas State in Venezuela
 Navia umbratilis L.B. Smith -  Amazonas State in Venezuela
 Navia viridis L.B. Smith -  Amazonas State in Venezuela
 Navia wurdackii L.B. Smith - Bolívar State in Venezuela
 Navia xyridiflora L.B. Smith -  Amazonas State in Venezuela

References

External links
 FCBS Bromeliad Photo Index
 BSI Genera Gallery photos

 
Bromeliaceae genera